A listing of universities in the Kingdom of the Netherlands:

Research universities
Research universities in the Netherlands are institutions of tertiary education that in Dutch are called universiteit. Their focus is towards academic education and scientific research. They are accredited to confer bachelor's, master's and (with the exception of the Netherlands Defence Academy) doctoral degrees. Prior to the Bologna Process, the universities granted drs. (doctorandus), mr. (for law studies) and ir. (for engineering studies) degrees, which are equivalent to current MBA, MA, LLM or MSc degrees. The term universiteit is reserved to doctorate granting institutes in the Dutch context, and the additional qualifier "research" is hardly ever used in practice. There are public Universities and Private Universities in Netherlands.

† 2003-2004; ‡ 2004-2005; # 2005-2006; * 2006-2007; ##including research staff at the associated institutes. All figures without signs are estimates or from undated sources. According to Dutch law, it is illegal to use protected titles which can only be given by universities that are accredited. Protected titles are ing. bc. mr. ir. drs. and dr. English variants (MSc BSc MA BA LLB LLM BEng PhD) are not (yet) protected by Dutch law (but using the title "dr." based on a PhD degree, without permission from DUO, is a violation of Dutch law as the title "doctor" is protected). One may bear in the Netherlands foreign titles according to the laws of the country wherein they were granted, but without translating them in Dutch.

Universities of Applied Sciences
Universities of applied sciences (Dutch: hogeschool) in the Netherlands are focused on professional education rather than scientific research. While the literal translation of hogeschool is "high school", these are second-tier institutes of higher education, and can be compared with colleges, polytechnics in other countries.
They are accredited to confer bachelor's and master's degrees. Prior to the Bologna Process, they also conferred professional engineer's (abbreviated ing.) degrees. Dutch universities of applied sciences are not accredited to confer doctoral (PhD) degrees; PhD studies can sometimes be conducted in the context of a university of applied sciences, however, the title will be granted by one of the research universities, and a full professor of that university will be appointed as principal supervisor (promotor).
In international contexts, the phrase University of Applied Sciences is used for the majority of these schools, as suggested by the Dutch Minister of Education. Some specific exceptions have been made. For example, tertiary art schools and schools of education use an internationally recognisable name of choice.
The Dutch Universities of Applied Sciences include the following:
Amsterdamse Hogeschool voor de Kunsten (Amsterdam University of the Arts), Amsterdam
Artez Institute of Arts, Arnhem/Enschede/Zwolle
Avans Hogeschool, 's-Hertogenbosch/Tilburg/Breda/Etten-Leur
Breda University of Applied Sciences, Breda
 Christelijke Agrarische Hogeschool Dronten, Dronten
Christelijke Hogeschool Ede (Ede Christian University of Applied Sciences), Ede
 Christelijke Hogeschool Nederland, Leeuwarden
Design Academy Eindhoven, Eindhoven
Fontys Hogescholen (Fontys University of Applied Sciences), Eindhoven/'s-Hertogenbosch/Sittard/Tilburg/Venlo
Fontys Hogeschool Journalistiek
 Gereformeerde Hogeschool, Zwolle
Gerrit Rietveld Academie, Amsterdam
The Hague University of Applied Sciences (De Haagse Hogeschool), The Hague
Hanzehogeschool Groningen (Hanze University of Applied Sciences), Groningen
HAS University of Applied Sciences, 's-Hertogenbosch
 Hogeschool De Horst, Driebergen
 Hogeschool Domstad, Utrecht
 Hogeschool Driestar educatief, Gouda
 Hogeschool Edith Stein / Onderwijscentrum Twente, Hengelo
 Hogeschool Helicon, Zeist
 Hogeschool IPABO, Alkmaar/Amsterdam
Hogeschool Leiden (University of Applied Sciences Leiden), Leiden
Hogeschool Rotterdam (Rotterdam University of Applied Sciences), Rotterdam
Hogeschool van Amsterdam (Amsterdam University of Applied Sciences), Amsterdam
Hogeschool van Arnhem en Nijmegen, Arnhem/Nijmegen
 Koninklijke Academie van Beeldende Kunsten (Royal Academy of Art The Hague), The Hague
Hogeschool Van Hall Larenstein, Leeuwarden, Wageningen, Velp
Hogeschool Utrecht (HU University of Applied Sciences Utrecht), Utrecht
Hogeschool voor de Kunsten (Utrecht School of the Arts), Utrecht
 Hogeschool voor Economische Studies (HES), Amsterdam/Rotterdam
 Hogeschool voor Muziek en Dans, Rotterdam
Hogeschool Zeeland (HZ University of Applied Sciences), Vlissingen
Hotelschool The Hague
Inholland University of Applied Sciences, Alkmaar/Amsterdam/Delft/The Hague/Diemen/Dordrecht/Haarlem/Rotterdam
 Inter College Business School, Amsterdam
 Iselinge Educatieve Faculteit, Doetinchem
Islamic University of Rotterdam, Rotterdam
 Katholieke PABO Zwolle, Zwolle
 NHL Stenden Hogeschool (NHL Stenden University of Applied Sciences), Leeuwarden
 PC Hogeschool Marnix Academie, Lerarenopleiding Basisonderwijs, Utrecht
 Pedagogische Hogeschool De Kempel, Helmond
Saxion University of Applied Sciences, Enschede/Deventer/Apeldoorn/Hengelo
NHL Stenden University of Applied Sciences, Assen/Emmen/Leeuwarden/Meppel
Stoas Hogeschool, Dronten/'s-Hertogenbosch/Wageningen
Windesheim University of Applied Sciences, Zwolle and Almere
Wittenborg University of Applied Sciences, Apeldoorn
Zuid Nederlandse Hogeschool voor Muziek (Maastricht/Tilburg)
Zuyd University of Applied Sciences, Heerlen/Sittard/Maastricht
Maastricht Academy of Dramatic Arts
Maastricht Academy of Fine Arts
Maastricht Academy of Music
Maastricht School of Translation and Interpreting

Private For-Profit Medical Schools 
Although there are none of these schools in the mainland, many exist in the Dutch Caribbean either in the special municipalities of the Netherlands or constituents countries of the Kingdom of the Netherlands. Only one is located in Amsterdam, the Amsterdam International University, which mostly offers courses via distance learning and online, while there are few classes that are held on campus when a course needs physical attendance and in particular (Saba University) only one has direct accreditation from Accreditation Organisation of the Netherlands and Flanders, which accredits universities in the Netherlands and Flanders.
Amsterdam International University
Aureus University School of Medicine
Xavier University School of Medicine
Avalon University School of Medicine
St. Martinus University Faculty of Medicine
Saba University School of Medicine
American University of Integrative Sciences
American University of the Caribbean School of Medicine

Private For-Profit Business Schools 
A number of private universities of applied sciences (hogescholen) are active in the Netherlands. Some of these are exclusively distance learning (online) medium learning providers.
 EuroPort Business College 
 HBO Nederland 
 Leidse Onderwijs Instellingen 
 Markus Verbeek Praehep 
 NCOI 
 Nederlandse Talen Instituut 
 Schoevers 
 Hogeschool Tio

Webster University: The American University in the Netherlands 
Webster University Leiden is a university outside the Dutch system, offering Bachelor and Master programs in the Netherlands. Webster University is a private, non-profit American university, accredited in the United States by the Higher Learning Commission's North Central Association.  The International Business and Management program, as well as the Applied Behavioral and Social Sciences program are accredited in the Netherlands by the NVAO at the hbo (professional master) level.

International rankings

In relation to their population size, Switzerland (first), Sweden (second) and the Netherlands (third) are the three countries with the highest number of universities among the 100 best of the Academic Ranking of World Universities (2014-2015).

Below are shown the international rankings of the government supported research universities of the Netherlands, and the number of times they rank in the top 200 of one of the six prominent global rankings:

Notes:
N.A.: Not Applicable
a Number of times the university is ranked within the top 200 of one of the six global rankings. 
b The university is ranked within the top 150 of all six global rankings. 
c The university is ranked within the top 100 of all six global rankings.

See also
List of colleges and universities by country
List of colleges and universities
Academic Degree

References

External links
 Accreditation Organisation of the Netherlands and Flanders (NVAO)
 CROHO (the official register of all recognized Dutch higher education studies)

 
 
 
Universities
Netherlands
Netherlands
Universities